Kathleen Megan Folbigg (née Donovan; born 14 June 1967) is an Australian woman who was convicted of murdering her three infant children, Patrick Allen (at age eight months), Sarah Kathleen (at age ten months) and Laura Elizabeth (at age nineteen months). She was also convicted of the manslaughter of her fourth child, Caleb Gibson (at age nineteen days). The deaths took place between 1989 and 1999. Her husband contacted the police after discovering her personal diary.
Folbigg is presently imprisoned, sentenced to forty years with a parole period of 25 years. She will be eligible for parole in 2028.

Folbigg maintains her innocence, claiming the four children died from natural causes.

Scientific and medical research suggesting the daughters may have died of natural causes was rejected by a judicial inquiry in 2019.  Subsequent research published in 2020 led ninety prominent Australian scientists and medical professionals, in March 2021, to petition the NSW Governor to pardon Folbigg, alleging all the deaths may be explained with genetics.

Early life
On 8 January 1969, Kathleen Folbigg's biological father, Thomas John "Taffy" Britton, murdered her mother, Kathleen May Donovan, by stabbing her twenty-four times. Kathleen was 18 months old. Her father was arrested on the day after the murder, and would go on to serve 15 years in prison for murder before being deported to England. Folbigg was made a ward of the state and placed into foster care with a couple. On 18 July 1970, she was removed from their care and placed into Bidura Children's Home. Two months later, Folbigg moved into a permanent foster care placement. This arrangement lasted until she was a young adult. She left school at the age of fifteen, and married Craig Gibson Folbigg in 1987.

Deaths

Caleb Gibson
Caleb Gibson Folbigg, born on 1 February 1989, was known to breathe noisily and was diagnosed by a paediatrician to be suffering from a mild case of laryngomalacia, something he would eventually outgrow; he was otherwise born healthy. On 20 February, Folbigg put Caleb to sleep in a room adjoining the bedroom she shared with her husband. During the night, Caleb stirred from midnight until 2 a.m. Found by Folbigg, the death was attributed to cot death. Caleb was 19 days old.

Patrick Allen
Patrick Allen Folbigg was born on 3 June 1990. Craig remained at home to help care for his wife and baby for three months after the birth. On 18 October, Folbigg put Patrick to bed. Craig was awakened by the sounds of his wife screaming and found her standing at the baby's cot. He noticed the child wasn't breathing and attempted to revive him by cardiopulmonary resuscitation. An ambulance was called and Patrick was taken to hospital. He would later be diagnosed to be suffering from epilepsy and cortical blindness, though the apparent life-threatening event would go unexplained. He died four months later due to seizures. On 18 February 1991, Folbigg telephoned her husband at work to report Patrick's death, saying "It's happened again!"

Sarah Kathleen
Following their second loss, the couple moved to Thornton, New South Wales, a suburb of Maitland. Sarah Kathleen Folbigg was born on 14 October 1992, and died on 29 August 1993, aged 10 months.

Laura Elizabeth
In 1996, the couple moved to Singleton. On 7 August 1997, Laura Elizabeth Folbigg was born. On 27 February 1999, Laura died, at the age of 18 months.

Justice system

Trial
Folbigg's trial lasted seven weeks. The prosecution alleged Folbigg murdered her four children by smothering them during periods of frustration. Their case relied on the improbability of all four children dying of natural causes, citing the now-dubious Meadow's law, a maxim attributed to British paediatrician Roy Meadow: "One sudden infant death is a tragedy, two is suspicious and three is murder, until proven otherwise."

During a jury replay of Folbigg's police interview, she attempted to run from the courtroom.

The defense made the case that Folbigg did not kill or harm her children and that she did not think that Craig was responsible either. Although prosecution witnesses were concerned about the lack of prodromal (early-warning) symptoms in any of the children, the defence posed natural explanations for the events such as cot death and, in the case of Laura's death, myocarditis. The defence highlighted that Folbigg was a caring mother, pointing to journal entries that showed the care and concern that she gave her children. Some of her acquaintances gave statements to investigators about her caring nature.

The defense pointed out that there were no direct admissions to the killings in Folbigg's journal entries, and that any entries indirectly suggesting her responsibility could be chalked up to a typical grieving mother's guilt. Folbigg appeared genuinely distraught to ambulance and police responders to the scene. They pointed out that no physical evidence could link Folbigg to murder; it was an entirely circumstantial case with very little consensus among the scientific experts who testified at trial.

Verdict
On 21 May 2003, Folbigg was found guilty by the Supreme Court of New South Wales jury of the following crimes: three counts of murder, one count of manslaughter and one count of maliciously inflicting grievous bodily harm. On 24 October 2003, Folbigg was sentenced to forty years' imprisonment with a non-parole period of thirty years.

Appeal
On 17 February 2005, the court reduced her sentence to thirty years' imprisonment with a non-parole period of twenty-five years on appeal. Due to the nature of her crimes, Folbigg resides in protective custody to prevent possible violence by other inmates.  Nevertheless, after a transfer of prisons, Folbigg was savagely beaten by another inmate on 1 January 2021.

Judicial inquiry
On 22 August 2018, New South Wales Attorney-General Mark Speakman announced there would be an inquiry into the convictions, to "ensure public confidence in the administration of justice". It was in response to a petition presented by her supporters. "The petition appears to raise a doubt or question concerning the evidence as to the incidence of reported deaths of three or more infants in the same family attributed to unidentified natural causes in the proceedings leading to Ms Folbigg's convictions," he said.

However, in the 500-page report, released in July 2019, a former chief judge of the District Court found he did not have "any reasonable doubt as to the guilt of Kathleen Megan Folbigg for the offences of which she was convicted".

Appeal against the judicial review 
Folbigg's legal team promptly called for a review of the inquiry, citing "bias".  The new evidence was presented to the appeal to the New South Wales Court of Appeal. The appeal was rejected on 24 March 2021.

Scientific and medical opinion

Petition for pardon
On 4 March 2021, a petition signed by more than 100 eminent scientists, including Dr. Carola Garcia de Vinuesa, was published by the Australian Academy of Science, calling for the NSW Governor to pardon Folbigg,
including scientific and medical explanations for each of the deaths.

Cause of death
Genetic evidence published in November 2020 showed that at least two of the children had genetic mutations that predisposed them to sudden cardiac death. The researchers concluded that the CALM2 mutation carried by Kathleen and her two girls altered their heart rhythm, predisposing them to sudden unexpected death possibly precipitated by their intercurrent infections (respiratory tract infection in Sarah; myocarditis in Laura) and/or by medications such as Laura's pseudoephedrine.

The other two children, Caleb and Patrick, each carried two potentially lethal genetic mutations in the gene BSN (Bassoon Presynaptic Cytomatrix Protein), which is linked to early onset lethal epilepsy in mice, with one mutation inherited from their mother and the second one likely inherited from their father Craig. None of the four showed signs of smothering in the autopsy.

See also
Sally Clark, a case in the United Kingdom where medical evidence caused a conviction to be overturned
Lindy Chamberlain

References

Further reading

1967 births
2000s trials
Australian female murderers
Australian people convicted of murder
Filicides in Australia
Living people
Medical controversies in Australia
People convicted of murder by New South Wales
Suspected serial killers